Ironman Sweden, also known as Ironman Kalmar or the Kalmar Triathlon, is an Ironman triathlon held in Kalmar, Sweden. It is the only Ironman-branded iron distance event in Sweden and also serves as the Swedish national championship. 

The distance is the same as other Ironman triathlons races:  open water swimming,  cycling and a  marathon. The start, transition and finish is located in the city of Kalmar.

The swim takes place in the Kalmar Strait, Baltic Sea. The running segment is a three-loop course that travels northwards partly along the shore.

In December 2011, World Triathlon Corporation purchased the Kalmar Triathlon and rebranded the event as an Ironman triathlon.

References

External links

Triathlon competitions
Sports competitions in Sweden
Sweden